Amphorogyne is a genus of hemiparasitic trees and shrubs in the family Santalaceae.  The genus is endemic to New Caledonia in the Pacific and contains three species. Its closest relative is Daenikera, also endemic to New Caledonia.

List of species
Amphorogyne celastroides 
Amphorogyne spicata 
Amphorogyne staufferi

References

Santalaceae
Endemic flora of New Caledonia
Santalales genera